The 1942–43 Irish Cup was the 63rd edition of the premier knock-out cup competition in Northern Irish football. 

Belfast Celtic won the tournament for the 6th time, defeating Glentoran 1–0 in the final at Windsor Park.

Results

First round

|}

Playoff

|}

Quarter-finals

|}

1 Larne were awarded the tie and Distillery were expelled from the tournament for playing an ineligible player in the previous round.

Semi-finals

|}

Final

References

External links
 Northern Ireland Cup Finals. Rec.Sport.Soccer Statistics Foundation (RSSSF)

Irish Cup seasons
1942–43 domestic association football cups
1942–43 in Northern Ireland association football